Houston's Restaurant is part of a group of upscale American casual dining restaurants, owned by Hillstone Restaurant Group, whose main corporate headquarters is in Phoenix, Arizona. There are 44 Hillstone locations in 12 states.

Company profile
The first Houston's restaurant was launched by current owner and CEO George Biel, Joe Ledbetter and Vic Branstetter in 1977 in Nashville, Tennessee. Bransetter sold his shares in 2006, and Ledbetter in 2011, leaving George Biel sole owner of the company. The corporate company, Hillstone Restaurant Group, Inc. (formerly Houston's Restaurants, Inc.), was founded in 1976 and owns the following restaurants:  Gulfstream, Bandera, Rutherford Grill, Palm Beach Grill, Cherry Creek Grill, Los Altos Grill, Woodmont Grill, R+D Kitchen, Hillstone, the Honor Bar, Honor Market, South Beverly Grill, East Hampton Grill, White House Tavern, and Houston's. As of 2020, the group owns and operates 44 restaurants under 15 different names in the United States.

Reviews
Zagat gave the restaurant high marks and remarked on its '"vibrant”, “modern” setting matched with a “lively bar scene”; “seamless”, “tag-team” service".'

Name change of certain locations
Since 2009, several Houston's locations around the US have changed their names to Hillstone.

The company maintains the changes are in keeping with a long-term strategy of disassociating from the chain image to remain a niche player in the industry.  The practice of changing restaurant names is not a new strategy for the company, which has similarly converted several Banderas to locally named Grills, all predating state and federal regulations. The company states that the name change was based on rebranding with a focus on more regional and less standardized fare.

References

Steakhouses in the United States
Restaurants established in 1977
Companies based in Beverly Hills, California
Restaurant chains in the United States